Lectionary 136, designated by siglum ℓ 136 (in the Gregory-Aland numbering) is a Greek manuscript of the New Testament, on parchment leaves. Palaeographically it has been assigned to the 12th century.

Description 

The codex contains lessons from the Gospels of John, Matthew, Luke lectionary (Evangelistarium), on 165 parchment leaves, with some lacunae at the beginning and end. The text is written in Greek minuscule letters, in one columns per page, 23 lines per page.
It is a palimpsest, the younger text is the Lectionary 135.

History 

The manuscript was added to the list of New Testament manuscripts by Scholz. 
It was examined by Scholz and Gregory. 

The manuscript is not cited in the critical editions of the Greek New Testament (UBS3).

Currently the codex is located in the Vatican Library (Barberin. gr. 472) in Rome.

See also 

 List of New Testament lectionaries
 Biblical manuscript
 Textual criticism
 Lectionary 134

Notes and references

Bibliography 

 J. M. A. Scholz, Biblisch-kritische Reise in Frankreich, der Schweiz, Italien, Palästine und im Archipel in den Jahren 1818, 1819, 1820, 1821: Nebst einer Geschichte des Textes des Neuen Testaments.

Greek New Testament lectionaries
12th-century biblical manuscripts
Palimpsests
Manuscripts of the Vatican Library